Yleinen työttömyyskassa (YTK), formerly known as Loimaan kassa, is the largest unemployment fund in Finland. It has over 400,000 members.

Yleinen työttömyyskassa is particularly popular among younger people.

References

External links
 Official website in english

Economy of Finland